John Muller (23 July 1933 – 1 July 2014) was a South African cricketer. He played two first-class matches for Border in 1959/60.

References

External links
 

1933 births
2014 deaths
South African cricketers
Border cricketers
People from Amahlathi Local Municipality